Sebastián Ariel Cuattrin (born September 6, 1973 in Rosario, Santa Fé, Argentina) is a retired Argentine Brazilian sprint canoer who competed from the early 1990s to the mid-2000s (decade). Currently, he is the Sprint Canoeing Committee supervisor in Brazilian Canoeing Confederation.

Career
Cuattrin was the first Brazilian sprint canoer to compete in the Olympic Games (1992 Barcelona) and Pan American Games (1991 Havana). He competed in four Summer Olympics (1992 Barcelona, 1996 Atlanta, 2000 Sydney e 2004 Athens) and he earned his best finish of eighth in the K-1 1000 m event at Atlanta, United States in 1996.

Cuattrin is the most medalist in Brazilian canoeing at the Pan American Games. He won eleven medals.

References

External links
Sports-Reference.com profile

1973 births
Argentine emigrants to Brazil
Brazilian male canoeists
Canoeists at the 1992 Summer Olympics
Canoeists at the 1996 Summer Olympics
Canoeists at the 2000 Summer Olympics
Canoeists at the 2004 Summer Olympics
Canoeists at the 2007 Pan American Games
Living people
Olympic canoeists of Brazil
Pan American Games gold medalists for Brazil
Pan American Games silver medalists for Brazil
Pan American Games bronze medalists for Brazil
Pan American Games medalists in canoeing
Medalists at the 2007 Pan American Games
Medalists at the 2003 Pan American Games
Medalists at the 1999 Pan American Games
Medalists at the 1995 Pan American Games